The 1893 West Virginia Mountaineers football team represented West Virginia University in the 1893 college football season. Led by F. William Rane in his first year, the Mountaineers finished the season with a record of two wins and one loss (2–1).

Schedule

Players
The 1893 roster featured fourteen lettermen.

 William Baker, Elkins, West Virginia
 William Bambick
 Alpheus Edward Boyd, Uniontown, Pennsylvania - End
 Wilford Hayes
 Josiah Keely
 Roy Knox
 George H. A. Kunst, Pruntytown, West Virginia - Guard
 Henry M. Leps
 Jacob Linn
 Forney Miller, Dunkard, Pennsylvania
 E. Bunker Reynolds
 Walter South - Halfback
 Walton Venerable
 Henry White, Camden, West Virginia - Tackle

References

West Virginia
West Virginia Mountaineers football seasons
West Virginia Mountaineers football